Popsa is a Russian musical drama film, released in 2005. The film was directed by Elena Nikolaeva. It is a film about the enduring passion of the inhabitants of the remote area to Moscow.

Plot
The eighteen-year-old provincial Slavka comes to Moscow with the dream of becoming a singer. Her hopes are connected with the famous music producer Larissa, whose business card is in her purse. Having experienced the  delights of the bohemian lifestyle of pop stars, Slava changes his views on life.

Cast
 Yelena Velikanova as Slavka
 Tatyana Vasilyeva as Larisa Ivanovna
 Dmitry Pevtsov as Dmitry  Gromov
 Vsevolod Shilovsky as  Yefim Ilyich Rakitin 
 Lolita Milyavskaya as  Irina Pepelyaeva
 Oleg Nepomnyashchy as  Yulik
 Lyanka Gryu as Alisa
 Aleksey Garnizov as composer
 Valery Garkalin as Lev Malinovsky 
 Ivan Rudakov as  Vlad, rock star
 Bari Alibasov as cameo

Soundtrack
Yevgeny Osin — The Golden Dream
Elena Masaltseva / Ivan Rudakov — Playing the Flute at Night
Elena Masaltseva — The Bird
Yuri Poteyenko — Theme
Dmitry Chernus — Lennon, Marley, Che Gevara
Velvet — I Want to Be Alive
Lolita Milyavskaya — Prisoner to Love
Ivan Rudakov — The Guitar

References

External links

 Sergey Kudryavtsev, Мелодраматическая комедия нравов

2005 films
2000s musical drama films
Russian musical drama films
Films set in Moscow
Films scored by Yuri Poteyenko